Marcos Valério Viana Mitchell, better known as Marcos Pimentel (Codó, August 26, 1983) is a Brazilian footballer who acts as right back for Altos.

Career

Began in the ADRC icas and still went by rail and Thirteen before stand out and be hired by Ceará in 2007.

In 2008, after a good year for the team Ceará, moved to Grêmio Prudente. Once again highlighted, was hired by Vitória for the 2010 season.

In red-black Bahia, ended up being much criticized, and upon receiving a proposal from Ceará, was released by the club.

Career statistics
(Correct )

Honours
Vitória
 Campeonato Baiano: 2010

Altos
 Campeonato Piauiense: 2017
 Campeonato Piauiense Série B: 2015

See also
Football in Brazil
List of football clubs in Brazil

References

1983 births
Brazilian footballers
Campeonato Brasileiro Série A players
Campeonato Brasileiro Série B players
Campeonato Brasileiro Série C players
Associação Desportiva Recreativa e Cultural Icasa players
Ferroviário Atlético Clube (CE) players
Ceará Sporting Club players
Grêmio Barueri Futebol players
Esporte Clube Vitória players
Guarani Esporte Clube (CE) players
Club Athletico Paranaense players
Associação Portuguesa de Desportos players
Santa Cruz Futebol Clube players
Comercial Futebol Clube (Ribeirão Preto) players
Associação Atlética de Altos players
Living people
Association football defenders
Sportspeople from Ceará